Sir Samuel Owfield (1595–1644) was an English politician who sat in the House of Commons  at various times between 1624 and 1644.

Owfield was the son of Roger Owfield, Fishmonger, of Billiter Lane, London and his wife Thomasine More, daughter of John More, merchant, of Ipswich.  Owfield had acquired the manor of Upper Gatton in Surrey by 1624. In 1624, he was elected Member of Parliament for Gatton. He was re-elected MP for Gatton as Sir Samuel Owfield in 1626 and 1628 and sat until 1629 when King Charles decided to rule without parliament and then did so for eleven years.  In 1638 Owfield inherited from his mother estates in Lincolnshire.  

In April 1640, Owfield was re-elected MP for Gatton in the Short Parliament. He was re-elected for the Long Parliament in November 1640, and sat until his death in 1644. 
 
Owfield married Katherine Smith, daughter of William Smith of London. His son William was also an MP.

References

 
 
 

1595 births
1644 deaths
People from Surrey (before 1889)
English MPs 1624–1625
English MPs 1625
English MPs 1626
English MPs 1628–1629
English MPs 1640 (April)
English MPs 1640–1648